Nenad Milosavljević (Serbian Cyrillic: Ненад Милосављевић, born February 6, 1954), also known as Neša Galija (Неша Галија), is a Serbian musician and politician, best known as the frontman of the Serbian and former Yugoslav rock band Galija. He is the brother of Galija vocalist and lyricist Predrag Milosavljević. Nenad Milosavljević is a member of Socialist Party of Serbia, and is a former deputy in the National Assembly of Serbia.

Biography

Early life
Milosavljević was born on February 6, 1954, in Niš, to father Čedomir and mother Branislava Milosavljević. His brother Predrag was born three years earlier.

He went to Ratko Vukićević Elementary School in Niš. As a child, he learned to play the accordion, participating in elementary school competitions playing it. He learned to play the guitar in high school. At the same time, he sang in Dr Vojislav Vučković Music School choir and in Culture and Arts Society Veljko Vlahović choir.

As a teenager he was under a strong influence of the hippie movement. He started performing in parks in Niš and in parks and on the beaches on the Adriatic coast, playing rock hits on acoustic guitar and harmonica.

Early career
Milosavljević started composing as a teenager, on the lyrics of poems by famous poets. He composed the song "Čuj kako jauče vetar" ("Hear the Wind Howl"), on the lyrics by Dobriša Cesarić, and "Pozna jesen" ("Late Autumn"), on the lyrics by Vojislav Ilić.

Milosavljević had his first public performance in September 1970, in a club in Niš, performing alone, playing acoustic guitar and harmonica. Soon after the performance, with a help of acoustic rock band Lutajuća Srca member Milan Marković, Milosavljević made his first recordings in Radio Niš Studio. After that, Milosavljević performed with Lutajuća Srca on several occasions. At the same time, he continued to perform alone. In 1973, he appeared on Festival Omladina's Evening of Free Forms, as a replacement for previously announced Lutajuća Srca on a suggestion by the band members themselves. The appearance on the festival helped him appear in numerous shows, including Radio Belgrade show Veče uz radio (Evening by the Radio). In 1974, on Belgrade Spring Festival Lutajuća Srca performed Milosavljević's song "Ta ulica je meni znana" ("I Know that Street", on lyrics from Sergei Yesenin's poem).

In 1974, he wrote the music for a project by amateur theatre Treća polovina (Third Half). After an idea by the director Desimir Stanojević, Milosavljević made an agreement with the members of the band Dva Lustera (Two Chandeliers) to form a band which would perform during the play. The band consisted of Milosavljević (vocals), Goran Ljubisavljević (guitar), Predrag Branković (bass guitar), Nenad Tančić (drums) and Bratislav Stamenković (keyboards), while Nenad Milosavljević's brother Predrag sang backing vocals. The band had their first rehearsal on January 4, 1976. Soon after, the band made their first live appearance, on a play by Treća polovina, on April 11, 1977, they held a concert in Niš National Theatre. The concert also featured Lutajuća Srca, acoustic rock band Život from Kruševac and Elementary School Ratko Vukićević choir.

Galija

In 1977, the members of Dva Lustera decided to change their name to Galija, choosing the new name after a kafana in which they used to gather. Galija, led by Milosavljević, released their debut album, Prva plovidba, in 1979. The album featured Predrag Milosavljević as a lyricist (the band's second album, Druga plovidba, released in 1980, was the first album to feature Predrag Milosavljević as the official band member). The band's first several releases featured progressive rock sound, but in the mid-1980s they turned towards more commercial sound. Galija reached the peak of popularity in the late 1980s and early 1990s, becoming one of the most popular acts on the Serbian rock scene.

Milosavljević was the only author of the music on the band's first three studio albums, Prva plovidba, Druga plovidba and Ipak verujem u sebe (1982). During the following years, other Galija members also wrote music for the band's song, but since the release of the album Trinaest (1996), Milosavljević has been the only author of the music.

Solo recordings
During his career, Milosavljević made only few solo recordings. In 1998, he appeared, alongside Toni Montano, Viktorija, Dejan Cukić & Spori Ritam Band, Ksenija Pajčin, Maja Nikolić, Neverne Bebe and others, on the charity live album Terorizam ne! (Terrorism No!) with the song "Jeleni" ("To Jelena"). In 2013, he appeared at the Beosong festival with the song "Ruža od baruta" ("Gunpowder Rose"), but failed to qualify to the finals.

Theatre music and activities
Milosavljević started writing music for theatre while still a teenager. In the early 1970s he wrote music for Anton Chekhov's The Festivities played by amateur Culture and Arts Society Veljko Vlahović. In the play he appeared as troubadour, playing guitar and singing his songs. In 1972, he composed the music for the play Aska and the Wolf (written after a short story by Ivo Andrić) directed by Marisav Radosavljević and played in Niš Puppet Theatre.

During the following years, Milosavljević wrote music for more than 100 theatre pieces, played in Puppet Theatre in Niš, National Theatre in Niš, National Theatre in Kikinda, DES Theatre in Belgrade, Theatre Bora Stanković in Vranje, National Theatre in Leskovac, National Theatre in Banja Luka, Belgrade Drama Theatre, Terazije Theatre, National Theatre in Belgrade, Atelje 212, Priština Theatre, Sombor Theatre, and other theatres.

Children's music
From 1974 to 1991, Milosavljević had cooperated with the Niš Scout Music Festival as a composer and arranger. Since 1979, he has cooperated with children's music festival Prolećna pesma (Spring Song), held in Kuršumlija, as a composer and arranger, and since 1986, as the festival editor. From 1979 to 1994, he had cooperated with Niš Children's Music Festival as a composer and arranger.

Film music
In 2002, Milosavljević wrote music for Zdravko Šotra's film Zona Zamfirova The music Milosavljević wrote, alongside other music used in the film, was released on two CDs, Zona Zamfirova – Zonina muzika (Zona Zamfirova – Zona's Music) and Zona Zamfirova – Manetova muzika (Zona Zamfirova – Mane's Music). In 2003, Milosavljević wrote music for Šotra's film The Robbery of the Third Reich (2004). The music from the film was released on CD in 2004.

Album production
In 2004, Milosavljević produced and arranged the double album Kalompuri (Black Train) by Srđan Azirović's Trumpet Orchestra. During the same year, he, together with Galija guitarist Dragutin Jakovljević, produced Galija's album Dobro jutro, to sam ja. In 2008, he produced and arranged the album Nečujna zvona (Silent Bells), featuring the traditional music of Kosovo and Metohija.

Political career
Milosavljević is a member of the Socialist Party of Serbia. On April 16, 2014, after the 2014 parliamentary election, he became a deputy in the National Assembly of Serbia.

Discography

With Galija

Prva plovidba (1979)
Druga plovidba (1980)
Ipak verujem u sebe (1982)
Bez naglih skokova (1984)
Digni ruku (1986)
Daleko je Sunce (1988)
Korak do slobode (1989)
Istorija, ti i ja (1991)
Karavan (1994)
Trinaest (1996)
Voleti voleti (1997)
Južnjačka uteha (1999)
Dobro jutro, to sam ja (2005)
Mesto pored prozora (2010)

Solo 
"Jeleni" (Terorizam ne!, 1998)

References 

EX YU ROCK enciklopedija 1960–2006, Janjatović Petar;

External links
Galija official website
Nenad Milosavljević at Discogs

1954 births
Living people
Musicians from Niš
Serbian rock singers
Serbian rock guitarists
Serbian record producers
Yugoslav rock singers
Yugoslav musicians
Children's musicians
Sportspeople from Niš